Ruth Masodzi Chikwira is the ambassador of Zimbabwe to Germany with accreditation to Poland and Switzerland.  In December 2019, she presented her letters of credence as Ambassador-designate to Canada.

Chikwira earned a bachelor's degree in administration from the University of Zimbabwe and a master's degree in business administration from the Free University of Brussels.

References

Ambassadors of Zimbabwe to Germany
Zimbabwean women ambassadors
Ambassadors of Zimbabwe to Poland
Living people
Year of birth missing (living people)
Ambassadors of Zimbabwe to Switzerland
University of Zimbabwe alumni
Ambassadors of Zimbabwe to Canada